Bàsquet Manresa, S.A.D., also known as Baxi Manresa for sponsorship reasons, is a professional basketball club based in Manresa, Spain. The team plays in the Liga ACB and Basketball Champions League. Their home arena is the Pavelló Nou Congost. Bàsquet Manresa has won the Spanish Championship once, in 1998.

Joan "Chichi" Creus is the team's most decorated player; he was the Spanish Cup Most Valuable Player in 1996, and the ACB Finals MVP two years later. Some others well known players that had played for Bàsquet Manresa are Juan Domingo de la Cruz, Roger Esteller, Derrick Alston, Serge Ibaka, Andrés Nocioni, Rolando Frazer, and the Basketball Hall of Famer George Gervin, that at the age of 38 spent one year in the team, averaging 23.1 points and helping them to avoid the relegation from the Spanish top division.

History 
Bàsquet Manresa was founded in 1931 with the name of Manresa Bàsquetbol Club and merged in 1934 with Club Bàsquet Bages for becoming Unió Manresana de Bàsquet. In 1940, the club wins the Copa Barcelona and integrates in CE Manresa as its basketball section.

In 1968 the club promotes for the first time to the Liga Nacional but is immediately relegated again in its debut season. Two years later, Manresa played again in the top tier and ended the league in the fourth position, thus qualifying for the first time to play the Korać Cup, where it reached the quarterfinals.

In 1979 the club splits from CE Manresa and becomes Manresa Esportiu Bàsquet and grew up until becoming a usual contender in the Liga ACB. With the sponsorship of TDK between 1985 and 2000, the club lived its best years. In 1992, as a professional club and according to the law, Manresa becomes a Sociedad Anónima Deportiva and changes again its name to Bàsquet Manresa. This name change allowed Manresa EB and its former rival CB Manresa to merge definitively.

In 1996, Manresa wins its first national trophy by defeating FC Barcelona in the Copa del Rey played in Murcia. Two years later, and after finishing the regular season in the sixth position and without the home-court advantage in any of the playoffs series, Manresa wins the 1997–98 Liga ACB after eliminating Adecco Estudiantes in the quarterfinals and Real Madrid in the semifinals, for winning in Tau Cerámica Baskonia 3–1 in the finals. As in the Copa del Rey won two years ago, Joan Creus became the MVP of the finals. This achievement is nowadays considered on the biggest surprises in Spanish sport ever.

As league champions, Manresa played the EuroLeague, but was eliminated in the group stage. The golden era of the club suddenly ended in 2000, after the relegation to Liga LEB by losing in the do-or-die match against Gijón Baloncesto, that ended 95–91 after an overtime.

Since its relegation, Manresa started to alternate seasons in ACB and LEB, with two league promotions in 2002 and 2007, as LEB champions. In 2012 and 2013, Manresa suffered two relegations in Liga ACB, but remained in the league due to the impossibility of LEB Oro teams to promote. In 2017, after registering the worst season in the top tier since the 1983–84 season, Manresa relegated to LEB Oro. However, the club achieved promotion just in the next season after beating Club Melilla Baloncesto in the final of the playoffs.

Sponsorship naming 
Bàsquet Manresa has several denominations through the years due to its sponsorship:

Logos

Home arenas
Pavelló Congost (1968–92), before 1968 the team played in not domed courts next to the football stadium of Pujolet.
Pavelló Nou Congost (1992–present)

Players

Basketball Hall of Famers 

 George Gervin, SG, 1989–1990, Inducted 1996

Retired numbers

Current roster

Depth chart

Head coaches 
Since 1967:

Francesc Casé 1967–1968
Josep Masseguer 1968–1969
Jeroni Alberola 1969–1970
Antoni Serra 1970–1977
Alfonso Martínez 1977–1978
Joan Martínez 1978
Josep M. Soler 1978
Jaume Berenguer 1978–1979
Joan Basora 1979–1981
Pere Guiu 1981
Miguel López Abril 1981
Jaume Ventura 1981–1984
Germán González 1984
Francesc Canellas 1984–1985
Miquel Bataller 1985
Juanito Jiménez 1985–1986
Joan María Gavaldá 1986–1988
Flor Meléndez 1988–1990
Ricard Casas 1990, 2001–2005
Pedro Martínez 1990–1994, 2014–2015, 2019–
Salva Maldonado 1994–1997, 2000–2001
Luis Casimiro 1997–1999
Manel Comas 1999–2000
Xavier García 2005
Óscar Quintana 2005–2007
Jaume Ponsarnau 2007–2013
Borja Comenge 2013–2014
Pere Romero 2014
Ibon Navarro 2015–2017
Aleix Duran 2017–2018
Diego Ocampo 2018
Joan Peñarroya 2018–2019

Season by season

Trophies and awards

Trophies 
 Spanish championships: (1)
 1997–98
 Spanish cups: (1)
1996
 2nd division championships: (1)
 LEB Oro: (1) 2007
 Catalan basketball leagues: (3)
 1997, 1999, 2021
 LEB Catalan basketball league (Catalan 2nd Division Cup): (2)
 2000, 2001
 Trofeu General Orgaz-Copa Ciutat de Barcelona: (1)
 1940

Individual awards 
ACB Finals MVP
 Joan Creus – 1998

Spanish Cup MVP
 Joan Creus – 1996

ACB Rising Star
Micah Downs – 2012

All-ACB Second Team
Dejan Musli – 2016

ACB Slam Dunk Champion
Nate Higgs – 2000
Serge Ibaka – 2008

ACB Three Point Shootout Champion
Sergiy Gladyr – 2010

LEB Oro MVP
 Jordi Trias – 2018

Notable players 

   Joan Creus
   Roger Grimau
   Rafa Martínez
   Albert Oliver
   Jordi Trias
   Sergio Llull
   Serge Ibaka
   Juan Domingo de la Cruz
  Juan Alberto Espil
  Andrés Nocioni
  Juan Pablo Vaulet
  Kieron Achara 
  Ádám Hanga
  Siim-Sander Vene 
  Rolando Frazer
  Marius Grigonis
  Gabriel Lundberg
  Chima Moneke
  Ismaël Bako
  Elias Valtonen
  Dejan Musli
  Toby Bailey
  George Gervin
  Granger Hall
  Nate Higgs
  Jeff Lamp
 Scott Machado
  Linton Townes
  Justin Doellman
  Derrick Alston

References

External links 
Official website

 
Catalan basketball teams
Liga ACB teams
Former LEB Oro teams
1931 establishments in Spain
Basketball teams established in 1931
Manresa